Deer Island is an island in the Colorado River, divided between La Paz County in the U.S. state of Arizona and San Bernardino County in the U.S. state of California.

References

Landforms of La Paz County, Arizona